This is a list of records and statistics of the FIFA Confederations Cup.

Debut of national teams
Each successive Confederations Cup had at least one team appearing for the first time.

Overall team records
In this ranking 3 points are awarded for a win, 1 for a draw and 0 for a loss. As per statistical convention in football, matches decided in extra time are counted as wins and losses, while matches decided by penalty shoot-outs are counted as draws. Teams are ranked by total points, then by goal difference, then by goals scored.

Medal table

Comprehensive team results by tournament
Legend
 – Champions
 – Runners-up
 – Third place
 – Fourth place
GS – Group stage
 — Qualified / Invited, but declined to take part
 — Did not qualify
 — Did not enter / Withdrew from continental championship / Confederation did not take part
 — Hosts

For each tournament, the number of teams in each finals tournament (in brackets) is shown.

Notes

Results of host nations

Results of defending champions

Results by confederation
 — Hosts are from this confederation.

AFC (Asia)

CAF (Africa)

CONCACAF (North, Central America and the Caribbean)

CONMEBOL (South America)

OFC (Oceania)

UEFA (Europe)

General statistics by tournament

Team tournament position

Most finishes in the top three 5,  (1997, 1999, 2005, 2009, 2013)
 Most finishes in the top four 6,  (1997, 1999, 2001, 2005, 2009, 2013)
 Most Confederations Cup appearances 7,  (1997, 1999, 2001, 2003, 2005, 2009, 2013);  (1995, 1997, 1999, 2001, 2005, 2013, 2017)

Consecutive
 Most consecutive championships 3,  (2005–2013)
 Most consecutive finishes in the top two 3,  (2005–2013)
 Most consecutive finishes in the top four 3,  (1997–2001), (2005-2013)
 Most consecutive finals tournaments 7,  (1997–2013)
 Most consecutive championships by a confederation 3, CONMEBOL (2005–2013)

Gaps
 Longest gap between successive titles 8 years,  (1997–2005)
 Longest gap between successive appearances in the top two 10 years,  (1995–2005)
 Longest gap between successive appearances in the top four 16 years,  (1997–2013)
 Longest gap between successive appearances in the Finals 18 years,  (1995–2013)

Host team
 Best finish by host team Champion,  (1999),  (2003),  (2013)
 Worst finish by host team Group Stage,  (1995, 1997),  (2001),  (2017)

Defending champion
 Best finish by defending champion Champion,  (2003),  (2009, 2013)

Debuting teams
 Best finish by a debuting team Champion,  (1992),  (1995),  (1997),  (2001)

Other
 Most finishes in the top two without ever being champion 1,  (1992),  (1997),  (2001),  (2003),  (2009),  (2013),  (2017)
 Most finishes in the top four without ever being champion 3,  (1992, 1999, 2009)
 Most appearances in Finals without ever being champion 5,  (1995, 2001, 2003, 2005, 2013)
 Most finishes in the top four without ever finishing in the top two 2,  (1997, 2013)
 Most appearances in Finals without ever finishing in the top two 4,  (1999, 2003, 2009, 2017)
 Most appearances in Finals without ever finishing in the top four 4,  (1999, 2003, 2009, 2017)

Matches played/goals scored

All-time
 Most matches played 33, 
 Fewest matches played 2, 
 Most wins 23, 
 Most losses 11, 
 Most draws 6, 
 Most matches played without a win or a draw 3, 
 Most matches played without a win 12, 
 Most matches played until first win 4, 
 Most matches played until first draw 9, 
 Most matches played until first loss 9, 
 Most goals scored 78, 
 Most hat-tricks scored 3, 
 Most goals conceded 33, 
 Most hat-tricks conceded 4, 
 Fewest goals scored 0, 
 Fewest goals conceded 1, 
 Most matches played always without scoring a goal 3, 
 Most matches played always conceding a goal 5, 
 Highest goal difference +50, 
 Lowest goal difference –23, 
 Highest average of goals scored per match 2.60, 
 Lowest average of goals scored per match 0.00, 
 Highest average of goals conceded per match 8.00, 
 Lowest average of goals conceded per match 0.33,  (1 goal in 3 matches)
 Most meetings between two teams 4 times,  vs  (1997, 1999, 2005, 2013);  vs  (1999, 2003, 2009 (twice))
 Most tournaments unbeaten 3,  (1997, 2009, 2013)
 Most tournaments eliminated without having lost a match 2,  (1995, 2005)
 Most tournaments eliminated without having won a match 4,  (1999, 2003, 2009, 2017)
 Most played with tournament champion 6,  (1995, 1997, 2001, 2005, 2013, 2017)

In one tournament
 Most wins 5,  (2003, out of 5),  (2009, out of 5; 2013, out of 5) 
 Fewest wins, champions (since 1995) 3,  (2005, out of 5)
 Most matches not won, champions 2,  (2005, out of 5)
 Most wins by non-champion 4,  (1999, out of 5),  (2009, out of 5)
 Most matches not won 4,  (1999, out of 5),  (2001, out of 5),  (2009, out of 5),  (2017, out of 5)
 Most losses 3,  (1999, out of 3; 2003, out of 3; 2017, out of 3),  (1999, out of 5),  (2001, out of 3),  (2003, out of 5),  (2005, out of 3),  (2009, out of 5),  (2009, out of 5),  (2013, out of 3),  (2013, out of 3)
 Most losses, champions 1,  (2001),  (2005)
 Most goals scored 18,  (1999)
 Fewest goals conceded 1,  (1992),  (1995),  (1995),  (2001),  (2003),  (2009)
 Most goals conceded 24,  (2013)
 Highest goal difference +12,  (1997, 1999)
 Highest goal difference, champions +12,  (1997)
 Lowest goal difference -23,  (2013)
 Lowest goal difference, champions +4,  (1995)
 Highest average of goals scored per match 3.60,  (1999)
 Most goals scored, champions 14,  (1997, 2009, 2013)
 Most goals scored, hosts 15,  (2005)
 Fewest goals scored, champions 5,  (1995)
 Fewest goals scored, hosts 0,  (1995)
 Fewest goals conceded, champions 1,  (1992),  (1995)
 Fewest goals conceded, hosts 1,  (2001)
 Most goals conceded, champions 6,  (1999),  (2005)
 Most goals conceded, hosts 11,  (2005)
 Lowest average of goals scored per match, champions 1.67,  (1995)

Streaks
 Most consecutive wins 12, from 3–2 Germany (2005) to 3–0 Spain (2013)
 Most consecutive matches without a loss 13, from 2–2 Japan (2005) to 3–0 Spain (2013)
 Most consecutive losses 8, from 1–2 United States (1999) to 0–2 South Africa (2009)
 Most consecutive matches without a win 12, from 1–2 United States (1999) to 0–4 Portugal (2017)
 Most consecutive matches without a draw 12, from 3–2 Germany (2005) to 3–0 Spain (2013)
 Most consecutive matches scoring at least one goal 13, from 2–2 Japan (2005) to 3–0 Spain (2013)
 Most consecutive matches scoring at least two goals 6, from 2–2 Japan (2005) to 3–0 Italy (2009), from 3–2 United States (2009) to 3–0 Spain (2013), from 4–3 Australia (2005) to 3–2 Australia (2017)
 Most consecutive matches scoring at least three goals 5, from 3–2 Germany (2005) to 3–0 Italy (2009)
 Most consecutive matches without scoring a goal 5, from 0–5 France (2003) to 0–0 Russia (2017)
 Most consecutive matches without conceding a goal (clean sheets) 5, from 2–0 Czech Republic (1997) to 2–0 New Zealand (1999), from 2–0 Canada (2001) to 1–0 Colombia (2003)
 Most consecutive matches conceding at least one goal 8, from 1–2 United States (1999) to 0–2 South Africa (2009)
 Most consecutive matches conceding at least two goals 8, from 1–2 United States (1999) to 0–2 South Africa (2009)
 Most consecutive matches conceding at least three goals 4, from 0–3 Japan (2003) to 0–5 Spain (2009)

Penalty shootouts
 Most shootouts, team, all-time 3, 
 Most shootouts, all teams, tournament 2, 1995, 2013
 Most wins, team, all-time 1, 
 Most losses, team, all-time 2, 
 Most shootouts with 100% record (all won) 1, 
 Most shootouts with 0% record (all lost) 1, 
 Most successful kicks, shootout, one team 7 (out of 7), vs Italy, 2013
 Most successful kicks, shootout, both teams 13 (out of 14),  (7) vs  (6), 2013
 Most successful kicks, team, all-time 12 (out of 15), 
 Most successful kicks, team, tournament 9, 2013 (in 2 shootouts)
 Most successful kicks, all teams, tournament 18, 2013 (in 2 shootouts)
 Most successful kicks, player 2, Claudio Suárez (1995); Alberto Aquilani (2013)
 Most kicks taken, shootout, both teams 14,  (7) vs  (7), 2013
 Most kicks taken, team, all-time 15,  (in 3 shootouts)
 Most kicks taken, team, tournament 11, 2013 (in 2 shootouts)
 Most kicks taken, all teams, tournament 23, 2013 (in 2 shootouts)
 Most kicks missed, shootout, both teams 4,  (3) vs  (1), 2013
 Most kicks missed, team, all-time 3,  (in 2 shootouts);  (in 1 shootout);  (in 1 shootout)
 Most kicks missed, all teams, tournament 5, 2013 (in 2 shootouts)
 Fewest successful kicks, shootout, one team 0, vs Chile, 2017
 Fewest successful kicks, shootout, both teams 3,  (0) vs  (3), 2013
 Most saves, all-time 3, Gianluigi Buffon (2013); Claudio Bravo (2017)
 Most saves, tournament 3, Gianluigi Buffon (2013); Claudio Bravo (2017)
 Most saves, shootout 3, Gianluigi Buffon, vs Uruguay, 2013; Claudio Bravo, vs Portugal, 2017

Goalscoring

Individual
 Most goals scored in Finals competition 9, Cuauhtémoc Blanco (1997, 1999), Ronaldinho (1999, 2005)
 Most goals scored in a Finals match 4, on four occasions, as follows:Cuauhtémoc Blanco (5–1 vs , 1999)Marzouk Al-Otaibi (5–1 vs , 1999)Fernando Torres (10–0 vs , 2013)Abel Hernández (8–0 vs , 2013)
 Most goals scored in a final 3, on two occasions, as follows:Ronaldo (6–0 vs , 1997)Romário (6–0 vs , 1997)
 Most matches with at least one goal 7, Ronaldinho (1999–2005)
 Most consecutive matches with at least one goal 4, Ronaldinho (1999)
 Most matches with at least two goals 2, Gabriel Batistuta (1992 & 1995); Vladimír Šmicer (1997); Romário (1997); Cuauhtémoc Blanco (1997 & 1999); Marzouk Al-Otaibi (1999); Alex (1999); John Aloisi (2005); Luís Fabiano (2009); Fernando Torres (2009 & 2013); Fred (2013)
 Most consecutive matches with at least two goals 2, Marzouk Al-Otaibi (1999); John Aloisi (2005)
 Most hat-tricks 2, Fernando Torres (2009 & 2013)
 Fastest hat-trick 11 minutes, Fernando Torres ( vs , 2009)
 Most goals scored by a substitute in a Finals match 2, on five occasions, as follows:Alex ( vs , 1999)Giuseppe Rossi ( vs , 2009)Daniel Güiza ( vs , 2009)Katlego Mphela ( vs , 2009)Luis Suárez ( vs , 2013)
 First goalscorer Fahad Al-Bishi, vs United States, 15 October 1992
 Youngest goalscorer 19 years and 10 days, Marcelo Zalayeta ( vs , 1997)
 Youngest hat-trick scorer 19 years and 132 days, Ronaldinho ( vs , 1999)
 Youngest goalscorer, final 21 years and 94 days, Ronaldo ( vs , 1997)
 Oldest goalscorer 38 years and 129 days, Lothar Matthäus ( vs , 1999)
 Oldest hat-trick scorer 32 years and 137 days, David Villa ( vs , 2013)
 Oldest goalscorer, final 31 years, 326 days, Romário ( vs , 1997)
 Most penalties scored (excluding penalty shoot-outs) 3, Michael Ballack (three in 2005)
 Fastest goal 75 seconds, Abel Hernández ( vs , 2013)
 Fastest penalty kick converted 8th minute, Michael Laudrup ( vs , 1995)
 Fastest goal by a substitute 1 minute, Mike Hanke ( vs , 2005); Giuseppe Rossi ( vs , 2009)
 Fastest goal in a final 91 seconds, Fred ( vs , 2013)
 Latest goal from kickoff 110th minute, Luciano Figueroa ( vs , 2005)
 Latest goal from kickoff in a final 97th minute, Thierry Henry ( vs  2003)
 Latest goal from kickoff, with no goals scored in between 104th minute, Carlos Salcido ( vs , 2005)

Team
 Biggest margin of victory 10,  (10) vs  (0), 2013
 Most goals scored in a match, one team 10, vs , 2013
 Most goals scored in a match, both teams 10,  (8) vs  (2), 1999 (10) vs  (0), 2013
 Largest deficit overcome in a win 2 goals, 2009 (coming from 0–2 down to win 3–2 vs ), 2013 (coming from 0–2 down to win 4–3 vs )
 Largest deficit overcome in a draw 2 goals, 1999 (coming from 0–2 down to draw 2–2 vs )
 Most goals scored in extra time, both teams 2,  (1) vs  (1), 2005
 Most goals scored in a final, one team 6, vs , 1997
 Most goals scored in a final, both teams 7,  (4) vs  (3), 1999
 Fewest goals scored in a final, both teams 1,  (0) vs  (1), 2001 (0) vs  (1), 2003 (0) vs  (1), 2017
 Biggest margin of victory in a final 6,  (6) vs  (0), 1997
 Largest deficit overcome in a win in a final 2 goals, 2009 (coming from 0–2 down to win 3–2 vs )
 Most individual goalscorers for one team, one match 5,  vs , 1999 (João Carlos, Ronaldinho, Zé Roberto, Alex, Rôni) vs , 2001 (Steve Marlet, Patrick Vieira, Nicolas Anelka, Youri Djorkaeff, Sylvain Wiltord) vs , 2003 (Olivier Kapo, Thierry Henry, Djibril Cissé, Ludovic Giuly, Robert Pires)
 Most individual goalscorers for one team, one tournament 8, 2001 (Steve Marlet, Patrick Vieira, Nicolas Anelka, Youri Djorkaeff, Sylvain Wiltord, Eric Carrière, Robert Pires, Marcel Desailly), 2005 (Kevin Kurányi, Per Mertesacker, Michael Ballack, Lukas Podolski, Bastian Schweinsteiger, Mike Hanke, Gerald Asamoah, Robert Huth), 2009 (Kaká, Luís Fabiano, Juan, Felipe Melo, Robinho, Maicon, Dani Alves, Lúcio), 2013 (Andrea Pirlo, Mario Balotelli, Daniele De Rossi, Sebastian Giovinco, Emanuele Giaccherini, Giorgio Chiellini, Davide Astori, Alessandro Diamanti), 2017 (Ricardo Quaresma, Cédric, Cristiano Ronaldo, Bernardo Silva, André Silva, Nani, Pepe, Adrien Silva)

Own goals
Mohamed Obaid Al-Zahiri, vs Czech Republic, 1997Andrea Dossena, vs Brazil, 2009Nicolas Vallar, vs Nigeria, 2013Jonathan Tehau, vs Nigeria, 2013Atsuto Uchida, vs Italy, 2013Michael Boxall, vs Russia, 2017Luís Neto, vs Mexico, 2017

Top scoring teams by tournament
1992: , 7 goals
1995:  & , 5 goals
1997: , 14 goals
1999: , 18 goals
2001: , 12 goals
2003: , 12 goals
2005: , 15 goals
2009: , 14 goals
2013: , 15 goals
2017: , 12 goals

Teams listed in bold won the tournament.

Coach

Foreign coach won 
None

Most champion 
All won one each

Won tournament both as player and as coach 
Dunga,  (1997 as player, 2009 as coach)

Discipline
Fastest sending off 24th minute, Mark Viduka,  vs , 1997
Latest sending off 112th minute, Raúl Jiménez,  vs , 2017
 Most sendings off (tournament) 6 (in 16 matches), 1999
 Most sendings off (all-time, team) 5,

Awards

Golden Ball
The Golden Ball was awarded to the best player of the tournament. A Silver Ball and Bronze Ball were also awarded to the second and third best players of the tournament, respectively.

Golden Boot
The Golden Boot was awarded to the top scorer of the tournament. If more than one players were equal by same goals, the players were selected based by the most assists during the tournament.

Golden Glove
The Golden Glove was awarded to the best goalkeeper of the tournament.

FIFA Fair Play Trophy
FIFA Fair Play Trophy was given to the team (or teams) who had the best fair play record during the tournament with the criteria set by FIFA Fair Play Committee.

Man of the Match Award 
The Man of the Match award was awarded to the most valuable player of every match in the tournament. It was first awarded in the 2009 edition, in South Africa.
  Neymar won four Man of the Match awards, which is a record in the tournament's history. He received all of them in the 2013 edition.

Attendance

 Green background shading indicates attendance records.

See also
FIFA World Cup
List of FIFA Confederations Cup goalscorers
List of FIFA Confederations Cup finals
List of FIFA Confederations Cup hat-tricks
List of FIFA Confederations Cup red cards

References

Footnotes

External links
 The Rec.Sport.Soccer Statistics Foundation (RSSSF)

Records
Appearances national team
International association football competition records and statistics